Ward B. Pafford (October 25, 1911 – January 23, 2011) was a chairman of the English Department at Emory University from 1953 to 1958, Dean of Valdosta State University from 1966 to 1971, and fourth president of the University of West Georgia from 1971 until his retirement in 1975.

Early life and education
Pafford was born in Jesup, Georgia to Bascom Anthony Pafford and Jeanette Dukes Pafford. He graduated from Savannah High School. Pafford graduated with A.B. and M.A. degrees from Emory University and a PhD from Duke University.

References

External links
 Ward B. Pafford papers, Annie Belle Weaver Special Collections, Ingram Library, University of West Georgia

1911 births
2011 deaths
Emory University alumni
Duke University alumni
Emory University faculty
Valdosta State University faculty
Presidents of the University of West Georgia
People from Jesup, Georgia